The 2015–16 season was Newcastle United's sixth consecutive season in the Premier League and their 123rd year in existence. This season, Newcastle United participated in the Premier League, FA Cup and League Cup. The season covers the period from 1 July 2015 to 30 June 2016.

Season overview

24 May 2015: Newcastle United guarantee participation in the 2015–16 Premier League by beating West Ham United 2–0 in the final match of the 2014–15 Premier League season.

4 June 2015: Newcastle United announce their pre-season schedule for 10 July to 1 August 2015, consisting of matches against near-neighbours Gateshead, a tour to the United States to face Mexican side Atlas and United Soccer League sides Sacramento Republic and Portland Timbers 2, as well as matches against Sheffield United, York City and German side Borussia Mönchengladbach upon returning to England.

10 June 2015: Newcastle United sack coaches John Carver and Steve Stone prior to the 2015–16 season. Former England manager Steve McClaren is appointed the club's new head coach on a three-year deal, with an option to extend to eight years. McClaren is also appointed to the Newcastle United Board of Directors, along with chief scout Graham Carr and club ambassador Bob Moncur. Mike Ashley and John Irving both step down from the Board of Directors, with managing director Lee Charnley the only person to remain on the Board.

17 June 2015: The fixture list for the 2015–16 Premier League is released. Newcastle United will start their season on 9 August 2015 with a home match against Southampton kicking off at 13:30.

1 July 2015: The club confirm Macaulay Gillesphey, Tom Heardman, Liam Smith and Jamie Sterry have signed their first pro contracts, Davide Santon joins Inter Milan for £2.8 million and Remie Streete joins Port Vale on a free transfer.

2 July 2015: Head Coach Steve McClaren confirms the arrival of new coaching staff members. Paul Simpson and Ian Cathro are appointed as assistant coaches, Alessandro Schoenmaker is appointed as a fitness coach and Steve Black joins in a consultancy role.

6 July 2015: Adam Campbell joins Notts County on a free transfer after being released by the club.

7 July 2015: Sammy Ameobi signs a two-year contract extension, committing him to the club until June 2017. He also joins Cardiff City on a season-long loan for the 2015–16 season.

11 July 2015: Georginio Wijnaldum joins the club from PSV for £14.5m on a 5-year contract.

21 July 2015: Newcastle United announce the signing of Serbian striker Aleksandar Mitrović from Belgian side Anderlecht on a five-year deal.

27 July 2015: Ryan Taylor joins Hull City on a free transfer after being released by the club.

28 July 2015: Adam Armstrong has joined Coventry City on a youth loan until 16 January 2016.

29 July 2015: Freddie Woodman has joined Crawley Town on a youth loan until 3 January 2016.

30 July 2015: Newcastle announce a signing Chancel Mbemba who has joined on a five-year deal.

31 July 2015: Newcastle announce their squad numbers for 2015–16 season and Andy Woodman leaves for Crystal Palace.

4 August 2015: Simon Smith is appointed as Newcastle United goalkeeping coach to replace Andy Woodman who went to Crystal Palace.

6 August 2015: Newcastle United sign Ivan Toney on a long-term deal from Northampton Town for an undisclosed fee. Former goalkeeper Jak Alnwick joins League One side Port Vale on a short-term deal. Fabricio Coloccini has signed a one-year extension to his contract which will keep him at St. James' Park until the end of the 2016/17 season, with the option of a further year.

7 August 2015: Shane Ferguson signs for Millwall on a 93-day emergency loan deal.

19 August 2015: Newcastle sign French winger Florian Thauvin from Marseille on a five-year deal, believed to be worth £12m. Rémy Cabella will go out on loan.

21 August 2015: Midfielder Mehdi Abeid joined Greek club Panathinaikos for an undisclosed fee.

1 September 2015: Olivier Kemen has joined Lyon on a Undisclosed deal. Shane Ferguson extends his loan spell to 9 January 2016. Former Newcastle Midfielder Jonás Gutiérrez has signed for Deportivo La Coruña on a free transfer. Haris Vučkić joins Wigan Athletic on a season-long loan.

11 October 2015: Goalkeeper Freddie Woodman is recalled from Crawley Town as Tim Krul is out for the whole season with a knee injury.

29 October 2015: Mike Williamson has joined Wolverhampton Wanderers on a one-month loan deal.

10 November 2015: Ivan Toney has joined Barnsley on a youth loan deal.

17 November 2015: Gaël Bigirimana has returned to Coventry City on an emergency loan deal. Mike Williamson has extended his loan deal to 16 January 2016.

1 December 2015: Mike Williamson has been recalled from his loan deal due to Jamaal Lascelles injury.

8 December 2015: Ivan Toney has extended his loan deal to 9 January 2016.

23 December 2015: Ivan Toney was recalled from his loan deal due to Papiss Cissé injury.

5 January 2016: Gaël Bigirimana has extended his loan deal until 24 January.

11 January 2016: Newcastle have confirmed the signing of Henri Saivet on a five-and-a-half deal.

12 January 2016: Shane Ferguson extends his loan spell to 23 January 2016. Newcastle have confirmed the signing of Jonjo Shelvey on a five-and-a-half deal.

14 January 2016: Adam Armstrong and Gaël Bigirimana have both extended their loan deals until the End of Season.

26 January 2016: Shane Ferguson has made his loan deal to a permanent deal.

27 January 2016: Newcastle have confirmed the signing of Andros Townsend on a five-and-a-half deal.

29 January 2016: Mike Williamson rejoins Wolverhampton Wanderers on a permanent deal. Ľubomír Šatka joins York City on a one-month loan deal.

31 January 2016: Florian Thauvin has signed for Marseille until the End of Season.

1 February 2016: Newcastle have signed Seydou Doumbia on a loan deal until the End of Season.

29 February 2016: Ľubomír Šatka has extended his loan deal until the End of Season.

2 March 2016: Eleven players are given schoolboy contracts prior to the 2016–17 season: Thomas Allan, Kieren Aplin, Lewis Cass, Isaac Gamblin, Lewis Gibson, Matty Longstaff, Jack Robson, Kurtis Russell, Ollie Walters, Kelland Watts and Adam Wilson.

11 March 2016: Managing Director Lee Charnley announced that manager Steve McClaren had been sacked as Newcastle United manager. A few hours later Steve McClaren was replaced by Rafael Benítez. Fabio Pecchia, Francisco de Míguel Moreno and Antonio Gómez Pérez all joined as first-team coaches.<ref name="Rafael Benitez: Newcastle United appoint Spaniard as Steve McClaren's successor"></</ref>

24 March 2016: Ivan Toney has rejoined Barnsley on a youth loan deal.

5 May 2016: Gabriel Obertan and Sylvain Marveaux left the club by mutual consent.

11 May 2016: Newcastle United were relegated to the Football League Championship as rivals Sunderland won 3–0 against Everton.

Club

Coaching staff

The Newcastle United first team coaching staff for the 2015–16 season consists of the following:

First Team

Players

First team squad

Reserve team

Youth team

Transfers

In

 Total spending:  £81.6m

Loans in

Out

 Total incoming:  ~ £5.01m

Loans out

Pre-season and friendlies

On 4 June 2015, Newcastle United announced their pre-season schedule which included a tour of the United States.

Competitions

Overall

Overview

Premier League

League table

Results summary

Results by matchday

Matches

The fixtures for the 2015–16 season were released on 17 June 2015.

 
 
 
 

 Note: Due to copyright restrictions, the full fixture list can't be reproduced without the relevant licensing from Football DataCo, but can be found here.

FA Cup

The FA Cup First Round Draw was made on 26 October 2015. Newcastle United had a bye in the First and Second Round, and entered the competition at the Third Round stage.

League Cup

The Capital One Cup First Round Draw was made on 16 June 2015. Newcastle United had a bye in the First Round, and entered the competition at the Second Round.

Statistics

Appearances and goals

Last updated on 31 May 2016.

|-
! colspan=14 style=background:#dcdcdc; text-align:center| Goalkeepers

|-
! colspan=14 style=background:#dcdcdc; text-align:center| Defenders

|-
! colspan=14 style=background:#dcdcdc; text-align:center| Midfielders

|-
! colspan=14 style=background:#dcdcdc; text-align:center| Forwards

Captains
Accounts for all competitions. Last updated on 15 May 2016.

Cards

Accounts for all competitions. Last updated on 15 May 2016.

Goals

Last updated on 15 May 2016.

Clean sheets
Last updated on 7 May 2016.

Notes and references

Newcastle United F.C. seasons
Newcastle United